Francesca Harper (born 1969) is an American dancer and choreographer. She is the daughter of dancer and educator Denise Jefferson and niece of Pulitzer Prize winning writer Margo Jefferson.  Harper was named a scholar of the arts in the Presidential Scholars Program in 1987. She studied at the School of American Ballet and the Joffrey Ballet School and went on to become a principal dancer in William Forsythe’s Ballet Frankfurt from 1994–1999. She was a ballet consultant for the film Black Swan, and has appeared as a dancer in the television series Boardwalk Empire. In 2005, she founded the non-profit dance company The Francesca Harper Project. Long Island University honored her with a Living History award during Black History Month in 2013.

References

External links 
 The Francesca Harper Project

1969 births
Living people
American female dancers
American dancers
Joffrey Ballet School alumni
School of American Ballet alumni